Rachel Susan Skinner  (née Bass; born December 1976) is a British civil engineer with Canadian-based consultant WSP Global. She was named as one of the Daily Telegraph Top 50 Influential Women in Engineering in 2016 and both the Best Woman Civil Engineer and the Most Distinguished Winner of 2017 at the European Women in Construction and Engineering Awards. Skinner became the youngest ever president of the Institution of Civil Engineers in 2020. In 2019, she was elected a Fellow of the Royal Academy of Engineering (FREng). She was appointed CBE for services to Infrastructure in the 2022 New Year Honours.

Early life and education 
Skinner was born in December 1976. She attended Downe House School. She earned a bachelor's degree with first-class honours in geography from Durham University, and states that she "fell into engineering completely by chance" when she took a job as a transport planner in 1998. The job was only meant to be for a few months, but Skinner decided to stay. In 2001 she was awarded a Master of Science degree in transportation planning and engineering with a distinction by the University of Leeds. In 2019 she returned to Durham to deliver the 'Hatfield College Lecture'.

Career 
Skinner has been involved with the Institution of Civil Engineers since 2003 when she became a chartered engineer (CEng). She is also now a fellow of the institution (FICE), and sits on its Trustee Board, and has chaired the ICE's London region in 2010, stood for Council in 2015 and was confirmed by the ICE council as succeeding vice president in April 2017. Rachel became president in November 2020,  and was the youngest ever person to hold the post of president of the ICE, and the second female president.  Skinner chaired the advisory board of the New Civil Engineer magazine between 2017 and November 2019. Skinner is a qualified transport planning professional and also a Fellow of the Chartered Institution of Highways and Transportation (MCIHT).

Skinner has held several senior positions at WSP Global, the consultancy and design firm, including as UK director of transportation planning and European director of marketing and communications for Parsons Brinckerhoff, and more recently as WSP UK head of development from January 2016 to December 2018. She is currently an executive director and head of transport for WSP's UK Planning & Advisory business where she leads around 600 staff delivering projects for public and private sector clients.

Skinner helped to set up the Women in Transport (formerly Women's Transportation Seminar) network in London in June 2005 and is now one of its Patrons, having been a founding member of its board and president from 2009 to 2013. Skinner also works to encourage schoolgirls into taking up STEM subjects.  She is a regular industry speaker, the lead author of papers on the implementation of driver-less vehicles including "Making Better Places" (2016), "New Mobility Now" (2017)  and various prior publications on the application of digital technology to the construction industry, collaboration and innovation.

In 2018, Skinner was invited to become one of ten Commissioners for the newly formed Infrastructure Commission for Scotland.

Skinner was appointed Commander of the Order of the British Empire (CBE) in the 2022 New Year Honours for services to infrastructure.  The same year Skinner was awarded an honorary doctorate by the University of Leeds.

References 

      
        
        
        
        
        

British civil engineers
Living people
British women engineers
1976 births
People educated at Downe House School
Alumni of the University of Leeds
Alumni of Hatfield College, Durham
Fellows of the Institution of Civil Engineers
Fellows of the Royal Academy of Engineering
Female Fellows of the Royal Academy of Engineering
Commanders of the Order of the British Empire